WVVB (1410 AM) is a daytime only radio station originally broadcasting a gospel format. Licensed to Kingston, Tennessee, United States, the station is currently owned by John and Brannigan Tollett, through licensee 3B Tennessee, Inc. On September 1, 2018, the then-WBBX was renamed 94.1 The Vibe. The station changed its call sign to WVVB on March 6, 2019.

References

External links

VVB (AM)
Contemporary hit radio stations in the United States
Radio stations established in 1978
1978 establishments in Tennessee
VVB